Siminina, was a Roman era civitas of the Roman province of Africa Proconsularis.
The ancient city is tentatively identified with ruins at Bir-El-Djedidi, Tunisia.

The city was also the seat of an ancient Christian bishopric, suffragan of Archdiocese of Carthage. Only two bishops of Siminina are documented
Deuterium was present at the Council of Carthage (484) called by the Vandal king Huneric. 
 Giuniano intervened in the Council of Carthage (525).
Today Siminina survives as a titular bishopric and the bishop until his death was Robert Patrick Maginnis of Philadelphia.

References

Former populated places in Tunisia
Catholic titular sees in Africa
Roman towns and cities in Africa (Roman province)